A constitutional referendum was held in France on 28 September 1958. Voters were asked whether they approved of the adoption of a constitution for the French Fifth Republic written by Charles de Gaulle. It was overwhelmingly approved, with 82.6% in favour. Voter turnout was 84.9% in Metropolitan France and 79.8% overall.

Results

The total includes Overseas departments, Algeria, Sahara, Overseas territories (except Guinea, French Togoland, French Cameroon, French New Hebrides and Wallis and Futuna) and French citizens living abroad.

By territory

See also
1958 Cameroonian constitutional referendum
1958 Chadian constitutional referendum
1958 Comorian constitutional referendum
1958 Dahomeyan constitutional referendum
1958 French Polynesian constitutional referendum
1958 French Somaliland constitutional referendum
1958 French Sudan constitutional referendum
1958 Gabonese constitutional referendum
1958 Guinean constitutional referendum
1958 Ivorian constitutional referendum
1958 Malagasy constitutional referendum
1958 Mauritanian constitutional referendum
1958 Moyen-Congo constitutional referendum
1958 New Caledonian constitutional referendum
1958 Nigerien constitutional referendum
1958 Saint Pierre and Miquelon constitutional referendum
1958 Senegalese constitutional referendum
1958 Ubangi-Shari constitutional referendum
1958 Upper Voltan constitutional referendum
1958 French constitutional referendum in French Togoland

References

External links
 

Constitutional referendum
Constitutional amendments
Referendums in France
French constitutional referendum
French constitutional referendum
Constitutional referendum
Constitutional referendums in France